Craig Binns (born July 18, 1974) is a Canadian former professional ice hockey defenceman.

Binns played three seasons (1991 – 1994) of major junior hockey in the Ontario Hockey League, scoring 3 goals and 19 assists for 22 points while earning 260 penalty minutes in 168 games played.

Binns went on to play ten seasons years of professional hockey, retiring after the 2003–04 season spent with the Lubbock Cotton Kings of the Central Hockey League.

Following his playing career, Binns settled in Midland, Texas where he is now a fireman with the Midland Fire Department.

Career statistics

References

External links

1974 births
Living people
Belleville Bulls players
Canadian ice hockey defencemen
Chicago Wolves (IHL) players
Columbus Chill players
Lubbock Cotton Kings players
Mobile Mysticks players
Newcastle Jesters players
Owen Sound Platers players
Tulsa Oilers (1992–present) players
Windsor Spitfires players
Ice hockey people from Ottawa
Canadian expatriate ice hockey players in England
Canadian expatriate ice hockey players in the United States